The Commander-in-Chief of the Armed Forces of Ukraine is the professional head of the Armed Forces of Ukraine. The position was created by President Volodymyr Zelenskyy on 28 March 2020, before which the Chief of the General Staff was the commander-in-chief.

Role
The Commander-in-Chief of the Armed Forces of Ukraine directs the Armed Forces of Ukraine, monitors the state of the army with military equipment, weapons, and other resources, reports to the President and the Minister of Defense on achieving military-strategic goals in defense.

The Law of Ukraine "On the Armed Forces of Ukraine" also stipulates that direct military leadership is an activity aimed at implementing measures for the development of the Armed Forces of Ukraine, their technical equipment, training, and comprehensive support, and determining the basis of their application and management.

Until 27 March 2020, in accordance with Art. 8 of the Law of Ukraine "On the Armed Forces of Ukraine", the Chief of the General Staff was the Commander-in-Chief of the Armed Forces of Ukraine.

On 5 March 2022, the current Commander-in-Chief of the Armed Forces of Ukraine, Lieutenant General Valerii Zaluzhnyi, was promoted to the rank of General by the President of Ukraine, Volodymyr Zelenskyy.

Commander-in-chief

Deputy commander-in-chief

References

Military of Ukraine
Ukraine
Commanders in chief